''For other places called Ambatoharanana, please see: Ambatoharanana (disambiguation)

Ambatoharanana is a town and commune in Madagascar. It belongs to the district of Mananara Nord, which is a part of Analanjirofo Region. The population of the commune was estimated to be approximately 9,000 in 2001 commune census.

Only primary schooling is available. The majority 95% of the population of the commune are farmers.  The most important crop is cloves, while other important products are coffee, rice and vanilla.  Services provide employment for 5% of the population.

References and notes 

Populated places in Analanjirofo